The 1974–75 Kansas Jayhawks men's basketball team represented the University of Kansas during the 1974–75 NCAA Division I men's basketball season.

Roster
Rick Suttle
Roger Morningstar
Norm Cook
Dale Greenlee
Danny Knight
Donnie Von Moore
Clint Johnson
Tommie Smith
Ken Koenigs
Milt Gibson
Chris Barnthouse
Marc Fletcher
Jack Hollis
Tom King
Dale Ladner

Schedule

References

Kansas Jayhawks men's basketball seasons
Kansas
Kansas
Kansas Jay
Kansas Jay